The Constitution Alteration (Rights and Freedoms) Bill 1988, was an unsuccessful proposal to alter the Australian Constitution to enshrine various civil rights, namely freedom of religion, rights in relation to trials, and rights regarding the compulsory acquisition of property. It was put to voters for approval in a referendum held on 3 September 1988.

Background

The constitution provides for 5 express rights, 3 which apply only to the Commonwealth, religious freedom, trial by jury, "just terms" compensation. The 2 rights which apply to all of Australia are free trade between the states, and protection against discrimination based on the state an individual lives in. 

The yes case was that the existing protections were inadequate as the state and territory governments were not bound to observe the rights.

The no case was that the proposals threatened existing rights and freedoms and could threaten the future of state aid for independent schools.

Trial by jury
The proposals had been considered by an Advisory Committee to the Constitutional Commission which reported in 1987. There are various limitations to the right in section 80 of the Constitution to trial by jury. The High Court had held in 1915 that the requirement to trial by jury did not apply to the local laws of a territory. While this decision had been criticised by High Court judges in later cases, it had not been overturned. The proposal was to extend the right to every state and territory. The right only applies to trials for indictable offences, which is a procedural matter referring to the form of the charge being "on indictment". While indictable offences are generally more serious than those that are tried summarily, the settled position in the High Court was that the right to jury trials did not apply to all serious offences, but only those determined by the Parliament. The proposal was to set the right to trial by jury to the seriousness of the penalty that may be imposed.

Freedom of religion
The "religious freedom" part of the proposed change was opposed by many churches and religious-affiliated schools concerned that it would be interpreted as requiring a level of church-state separation that would put public funding and government assistance for faith schools in jeopardy.

Conversely, Liberal senator Richard Alston argued that the aforementioned provision could place the use of corporal punishment in religious schools beyond the power of the government to regulate.

Compulsory acquisition of property

Section 51 of the Constitution sets out specific powers of the Commonwealth, including for the acquisition of property. The founders viewed this as the express conferral of a power and not a civil liberties provision.  None the less it has come to be seen as one of the few express rights in the Constitution.

Question

A Proposed Law: To alter the Constitution to extend the right to trial by jury, to extend freedom of religion, and to ensure fair terms for persons whose property is acquired by any government.

Do you approve this proposed alteration?

The proposal was to add a new provision to the Constitution as follows :Section 80 Trial by jury
The trial on indictment of any offence against any law of the Commonwealth shall be by jury, and every such trial shall be held in the State where the offence was committed, and if the offence was not committed within any State the trial shall be held at such place or places as the Parliament prescribes.

shall be held at such place or places as the Parliament prescribes.

115A Acquisition of property under State law.
A law of a State may not provide for the acquisition of property from any person except on just terms.

115B Acquisition of property in Territories.
 A law made under section one hundred and twenty-two or a law of a Territory may not provide for the acquisition of property from any person except on just terms.

Section 116 Commonwealth not to legislate in respect of religion No establishment etc. of religion
 The Commonwealth, a State or a Territory shall not make any law for establishing establish any religion, or for imposing impose any religious observance or for prohibiting prohibit the free exercise of any religion, and no religious test shall be required as a qualification for any office or public trust under the Commonwealth, a State or a Territory.

Results

See also
Politics of Australia
History of Australia

References

Further reading
 
 Australian Electoral Commission (2007) Referendum Dates and Results 1906 – Present AEC, Canberra.

1988 referendums
Referendum Rights and Freedoms
1988 Rights and Freedoms
Proposed laws of Australia